"Here We Go (Let's Rock & Roll)" is a song by American dance music group C+C Music Factory, released on March 3, 1991 as the second single from their debut album, Gonna Make You Sweat (1990). The song was a success in the US, reaching number three on the Billboard Hot 100 and number seven on the Billboard Hot R&B/Hip-Hop Songs chart. It also hit number one on the Billboard Hot Dance Club Play chart for three weeks. In Europe, the single reached number 20 on the UK Singles Chart and number five on the UK Dance Singles Chart. The song was certified gold by the RIAA for sales of over 500,000 copies.

Critical reception
AllMusic editor Jose F. Promis declared "Here We Go (Let's Rock & Roll)" as "anthemic", noting further that it "melded house, hip-hop, and rock." Larry Flick from Billboard viewed it as an "frenetic hip-hop anthem, covered with white-hot metal guitar riffs and rapid-fire rhyming by Freedom Williams." Marisa Fox from Entertainment Weekly described it as a "jumpy track complete with an electric-guitar intro." Pan-European magazine Music & Media commented, "Gonna make you sweat again. Their grooves are just right. Presenting Freedom Williams and Zelma Davis, C+C will be the chartbusters of 1991." James Hamilton from Music Week called the track a "lurching jitterer". A reviewer from People Magazine wrote that it is "tough funk, like a bastard child of Eddie Van Halen and the Staple Singers. Throughout, synthesizer bullets shoot at your feet until you dance." Jack Barron from Record Mirror felt that Williams "jabs his rap through this current club favourite with all the aplomb of a pit bull greeting a poodle", adding that it is "replete with every kind of dance hook".

Charts

Weekly charts

Year-end charts

Certifications

See also
 List of number-one dance singles of 1991 (U.S.)

References

1991 singles
C+C Music Factory songs
Cashbox number-one singles
Songs written by Robert Clivillés
Song recordings produced by Robert Clivillés
Columbia Records singles
1990 songs